The women's high jump event at the 1988 World Junior Championships in Athletics was held in Sudbury, Ontario, Canada, at Laurentian University Stadium on 28 and 29 July.

Medalists

Results

Final
29 July

Qualifications
28 Jul

Group A

Group B

Participation
According to an unofficial count, 23 athletes from 17 countries participated in the event.

References

High jump
High jump at the World Athletics U20 Championships